I'm a Celebrity...Get Me Out of Here! returned for its sixteenth series on 13 November 2016 on ITV. It was the second in a three-year contract, as confirmed by Ant & Dec at the end of the Coming Out show on 9 December 2015.

Following the end of the previous series, the spin-off show, I'm a Celebrity...Get Me Out of Here! NOW! was rebranded I'm a Celebrity: Extra Camp. It was also announced that Laura Whitmore and David Morgan had quit the show and were replaced by Vicky Pattison, Stacey Solomon and Chris Ramsey. Joe Swash remained as part of the spin-off.

Gogglebox star Scarlett Moffatt won the show on 4 December 2016, with stand up comedian Joel Dommett finishing runner up and Emmerdale star Adam Thomas finishing third. This was the first time in the show's history that two women have won consecutive series.

Celebrities
The celebrity cast line-up for the sixteenth series was confirmed on 7 November 2016.

{| class="wikitable sortable" style="text-align: center; white-space:nowrap; margin:auto; font-size:95.2%;"
|-
! scope="col" | Celebrity
! scope="col" | Known for
! scope="col" | Status
|-
| style="background:lavender;"|Scarlett Moffatt
| style="background:lavender;"|Gogglebox star
| style=background:lightgreen|Winner'on 4 December 2016
|-
| Joel Dommett
| Stand-up comedian
| style=background:yellow|Runner-upon 4 December 2016
|-
| Adam Thomas
| Emmerdale actor
| style=background:tan|Third placeon 4 December 2016
|-
| Sam Quek
| Olympic field hockey player
| style="background:salmon;" |Eliminated 9th on 3 December 2016
|-
| Wayne Bridge
| Former England footballer
| style="background:salmon;" |Eliminated 8th on 2 December 2016
|-
| Martin Roberts
| Homes Under the Hammer presenter
| style="background:salmon;" |Eliminated 7th on 2 December 2016
|-
| Larry Lamb
| Stage & screen actor
| style="background:salmon;" |Eliminated 6th on 1 December 2016
|-
| Carol Vorderman
| Former Countdown presenter
| style="background:salmon;" |Eliminated 5th on 30 November 2016
|-
| Jordan Banjo
| Diversity dancer
| style="background:salmon;" |Eliminated 4th on 29 November 2016
|-
| Ola Jordan
| Former Strictly Come Dancing professional
| style="background:salmon;" |Eliminated 3rd on 28 November 2016
|-
| Lisa Snowdon
| Television & radio presenter
| style="background:salmon;" |Eliminated 2nd on 27 November 2016
|-
| Danny Baker
| Television & radio presenter
| style="background:salmon;" |Eliminated 1st on 25 November 2016
|-
|}

Results and elimination
 Indicates that the celebrity was immune from the vote
 Indicates that the celebrity received the most votes from the public
 Indicates that the celebrity received the fewest votes and was eliminated immediately (no bottom two)
 Indicates that the celebrity was named as being in the bottom two
 Indicates that the celebrity received the second fewest votes and was not named in the bottom two

Notes
 The public were voting for who they wanted to nominate camp president, not for who they wanted to save.
 Danny and Martin did not enter the jungle until Day 5 and therefore could not be nominated camp president.
 Larry was exempt from this vote as he had already been nominated camp president by the public.
 As part of the Claim of Thrones bushtucker trials the winners of this would gain immunity from the first elimination. Adam, Ola, Sam and Wayne became immune by the end of the trials.
 There was no elimination on Day 14, with the public voting for who they wanted to face the next Bushtucker trial rather than to save.
 The public voted for who they wanted to win, rather than save.

Bushtucker trials
The contestants take part in daily trials to earn food. These trials aim to test both physical and mental abilities. The winner is usually determined by the number of stars collected during the trial, with each star representing a meal earned by the winning contestant for their camp mates. From 2014, the public voted for who took part in the trials via the I'm a Celebrity...'' app, from iOS and Android devices.

 The public voted for who they wanted to face the trial
 The contestants decided who would face the trial
 The trial was compulsory and neither the public nor celebrities decided who took part

Notes
1 The celebrities were divided into two teams; "City Celebs" (Adam, Carol, Joel, Jordan and Ola) and "Jungle Celebs" (Larry, Lisa, Sam, Scarlett and Wayne). The City Celebs picked a Jungle Celeb to help them avoid the bushtucker trial. Carol picked Lisa, Ola picked Sam, Jordan picked Scarlett, Adam picked Larry, and Joel picked Wayne. Each celebrity competed in a task, where the person whose partner lost had to face the first bushtucker trial.
2 Larry and Scarlett were excluded from the trial on medical grounds.
3 Larry, Martin and Scarlett were excluded from the trial on medical grounds.
4 As winners of the first Claim of Thrones trial, Adam, Martin, Sam and Wayne became the first four "Royals", who moved to live in Snake Rock, whereas the remaining celebrities became "Subjects" and continued to live in Croc Creek.
5 The public voted from the four "Royals" (Adam, Martin, Sam and Wayne) to face two "Subjects" who the remaining campmates chose. They chose Joel and Ola.
6 The public voted from the four "Royals" (Adam, Ola, Sam and Wayne) to face two more "Subjects" who the remaining campmates chose. They chose Lisa and Scarlett. As a result of Adam and Wayne being chosen, Ola and Sam became immune from the first elimination.

Star count

Dingo Dollar challenges
Member(s) from camp will take part in the challenge to win 'Dingo Dollars'. If they win them then they can then take the dollars to the 'Outback Shack', where they can exchange them for camp luxuries with Kiosk Keith. Two options are given and the celebrities can choose which they would like to win. However, to win their luxury, a question is asked to the celebrities still in camp via the telephone box. It is often joked that Ant & Dec make up these questions and their answers. If the question is answered correctly, the celebrities can take the items back to camp. If wrong, they receive nothing and Kiosk Keith will close the shack.

 The celebrities got the question correct
 The celebrities got the question wrong
 No question was asked

Notes
1 As the reigning royals, Adam, Ola, Sam and Wayne were the only participants in this Dingo Dollar Challenge. After receiving their Dingo Dollars, they didn't have to answer a question as their prize was automatically awarded to them. They did however have the decision to share their prize with the "Subjects"; they accepted this offer.

Ratings
Official ratings are taken from BARB.

References

External links
 

16
2016 in British television
2016 British television seasons